Symphony No. 5 in D Major may refer to:

 Symphony No. 5 (Mendelssohn)
 Symphony No. 5 (Vaughan Williams)